Kizhakkambalam is an eastern suburb of the city of Kochi in Ernakulam district, Kerala, India. It is regarded as a model panchayat for its various development activities and is a part of the Kunnathunad tehsil of the Ernakulam district.

Demographics
Kizhakkambalam has a large Christian population with the Jacobite and Catholic denominations in the majority. and its official language is Malayalam. The area was originally a farming village, but the majority now work in secondary and tertiary industries. Corporations such as Anna, Kitex, Sevana, KG Packers, Blackcat, and  Wireropes employ approximately 40% of local workers in corporate-related work. The amusement park Wonderla Kochi is located 3 km away from Kizhakkambalam. Some people believe that Kizhakkambalam's name came from a kahzak (meaning a hanging tree for the death sentence) that stood in the suburb in ancient times; others believe the name Kizhakkambalam came from the Kizhakkambalam Temple (Ambalam)  located in the (Kizhak) east from Thrikkakara Temple.

According to the 2011 census of India, Kizhakkambalam has 5,551 households. The literacy rate of the village is 85.53%.

Administration
Kizhakkambalam Panchayath is ruled by an organization called Twenty-20, which is sponsored by the commercial organization Kitex. In the local governing body election held in November 2015, 17 out of 19 wards of the local panchayat were won by Twenty-20. The aim of this organization is to make Kizhakkambalam a role model village by 2020. They spearheaded many infrastructure projects, such as roads and drinking water, inside the village. The organization also led an anti-alcohol campaign.

Location

References

External links 
 Census of India: Villages with population 5000 & above. Retrieved 2008-12-10.
 . Kizhakkambalam Gram Panchayat

Suburbs of Kochi
Villages in Kunnathunad taluk